Desulfococcus multivorans is a sulfate-reducing bacterium from the genus of Desulfococcus which has been isolated from a sewage digester in Germany.

References

Further reading

External links 
Type strain of Desulfococcus multivorans at BacDive -  the Bacterial Diversity Metadatabase

Desulfobacterales
Bacteria described in 1981